The Spanish Coquina Quarries are an historic site in St. Augustine Beach, Florida. They are located off A1A in Anastasia State Park. They were added to the National Register of Historic Places in 1972.

References

External links
 St. Johns County listings at National Register of Historic Places
 Florida's Office of Cultural and Historical Programs
 St. Johns County listings at Florida's Office of Cultural and Historical Programs
 St. Johns County markers
 Spanish Coquina Quarries
Florida stone quarry information on Stone Quarries and Beyond

Quarries in the United States
National Register of Historic Places in St. Johns County, Florida
Spanish Florida